Dhiraj Kumar is a Senior Fellow at the International Centre for Genetic Engineering and Biotechnology (ICGEB) and the leader of the Celular Immunology Team there. He is involved in the study and research on mycobacterium tuberculosis infection. He was awarded the Shanti Swarup Bhatnagar Prize for Science and Technology in Medical Sciences in the year 2019 for his contributions towards better understanding of tuberculosis.

Education
Dhiraj Kumar obtained MSc degree from Indian Council of Agricultural Research in 2002 and PhD degree from ICGEG in 2007.

References

External links

ORCID

Recipients of the Shanti Swarup Bhatnagar Award in Medical Science
Indian medical researchers
Year of birth missing (living people)
Living people